A number of steamships have carried the name Borussia.

, first screw steamer built in Prussia, sank in 1874
, built in Greenock for HAPAG, sank in 1879
, sank in 1907
, in service to 1939 (renamed 1945, and later  scrapped) 

Ship names